55:12 is the first full-length studio album by Virginia-based post-rock band Gregor Samsa, released in 2006 on The Kora Records.

The album was tracked at the Recorditorium in Richmond, engineered by Jason Laferrera, and produced by Gregor Samsa. The mix was done by Brian Paulson (Slint, Wilco, Beck).

Track listing

Gregor Samsa
Champ Bennett – guitar, vocals, keyboards
Nikki King – Rhodes piano, keyboards, vocals
Jason LaFerrera – bass, keyboards
Billy Bennett – drums, vibraphone, percussion

References

Gregor Samsa (band) albums
2006 albums